American Express Global Business Travel (Amex GBT, legally, Global Business Travel Group, Inc.) is a multinational travel management company headquartered in New York City. Amex GBT has 13,500 employees in more than 140 countries. American Express holds a minority interest in Amex GBT, but the travel company operates as a separate entity from the financial services group.

History 
In 2014 American Express divested their Global Business Travel division for an investment of $900 million to an investor group creating American Express Global Business Travel. The investment group was led by Certares LP and included Qatar Holdings, Macquarie Capital and funds managed by BlackRock and Teacher Retirement System of Texas. American Express maintained 50-percent ownership of the newly created American Express Global Business Travel (GBT).

In December 2021, American Express GBT announced plans to become a publicly traded company through a business combination with Apollo Strategic Growth Capital, a special-purpose acquisition company (SPAC) backed by Apollo Global Management.

Following the completion of the business combination with Apollo Strategic Growth Capital on May 27, 2022, the company began trading on the New York Stock Exchange on May 31, 2022, with the symbol GBTG.

Acquisitions 

 August 2016: KDS[i]
 May 2016: SMT Travel Agency
 June 2017: Banks Sadler
 February 2018: Hogg Robinson Group
 August 2019: Kanoo Travel
 June 2019: DER Business Travel
 October 2020: 30SecondstoFly
 January 2021: Ovation
 May 2021: Egencia

References 

American Express
Travel and holiday companies of the United States
Travel agencies
Travel management
Companies based in Jersey City, New Jersey